2-Nonenal is an unsaturated aldehyde.  The colorless liquid is an important aroma component of aged beer and buckwheat.

Odor characteristics
The odor of this substance is perceived as orris, fat and cucumber.  Its odor has been associated with human body odor alterations during aging.

References

Further reading
 

Fatty aldehydes
Flavors
Alkenals